NOV Inc., formerly National Oilwell Varco, is an American multinational corporation based in Houston, Texas. It is a worldwide provider of equipment and components used in oil and gas drilling and production operations, oilfield services, and supply chain integration services to the upstream oil and gas industry. The company conducts operations in more than 500 locations across six continents, operating through three reporting segments: Rig Technologies, Wellbore Technologies, and Completion & Production Solutions.

History

Background
NOV's two main predecessors, Oilwell Supply and National Supply, were founded in 1862 and 1893, respectively. These two companies manufactured and distributed pumps and derricks. In 1930, United States Steel acquired Oilwell Supply. In 1958, Armco Steel merged with National Supply. In 1987, National Supply merged with USS Oilwell to become "National Oilwell".

Varco was founded as Abegg and Reinhold Company by Walter Abegg and Baldwin Reinhold in 1908. "VARCO" is an acronym for: Vuilleumiere, Abegg and Reinhold Company after Edgar Vuilleumiere became a partner in 1915, and Varco International in 1973. In 2000, National Oilwell merged with IRI International Corp., founded and managed by Hushang Ansary, which manufactures and sells drilling rigs and specialty steel products.

In 2005, National Oilwell and Varco merged to become National Oilwell Varco.

Recent history
The company acquired major drill pipe and drill bit manufacturer Grant Prideco in 2008 for $7.37 billion. At the time, Grant Prideco held 60% of the global drill pipe market and operated 25 manufacturing sites worldwide. The acquisition included Grant Prideco's subsidiaries IntelliServ, a producer of drill pipe with built-in equipment to transmit data from a wellhead to surface operators, ReedHycalog, a drill bit producer, and XL Systems, a producer of oil and gas connectors. Grant Prideco, IntelliServ, and ReedHycalog became part of NOV's Wellbore Technologies reporting segment and XL Systems joined the Completion & Production Solutions segment.

In February 2012 NOV acquired Russian coring company Interval Ltd. and purchased Dutch oil rig design company GustoMSC in 2018. GustoMSC, originally the engineering office of Gusto Shipyard, became part of NOV's Rig Technologies segment. In late 2019, NOV bought Bellingham, Washington-based Ershigs, a fabricator of custom pipes and tanks.

National Oilwell Varco changed its name to NOV Inc. on January 1, 2021.

Corporate affairs

The company's headquarters are in Southwest Management District (formerly Greater Sharpstown), Houston. , it employed over 27,000 people and operated over 550 facilities worldwide.

In 2014, Clay Williams took over as CEO of National Oilwell Varco, succeeding former CEO Pete Miller, who served as NOV's CEO for nearly 13 years. Miller was expected to become executive chairman of the National Oilwell Varco spinoff company, DistributionNow.

Divisions

Rig Technologies
Rig Technologies engineers and manufactures drilling rigs, drilling equipment packages, and related capital equipment (including top drives, iron roughnecks, drawworks, blowout preventers, mud pumps, risers, pipe handling, power and control systems) necessary to drill oil and gas wells, as well as marine construction equipment such as heavy-lift cranes, mooring machinery, jacking systems, pipelay and cablelay systems, and marine riser tensioners. In addition, the segment provides aftermarket equipment and services such as spare parts, repair, and equipment rentals as well as remote equipment monitoring, technical support, field service, and customer training.

Wellbore Technologies
Wellbore Technologies develops equipment, technologies, and services for oil and gas well operation. The segment provides drill bits, borehole enlargement services, and directional drilling tools; optimization/automation software and services; downhole tools for drilling and intervention; premium drill pipe and drill stem accessories; solids control and waste management equipment and services; drilling and completion fluids; data acquisition and analytics technologies; managed-pressure-drilling systems; coating and inspection services and RFID technology for drill pipe lifecycle management; and IntelliServ wired drill pipe.

Completion & Production Solutions
Completion & Production Solutions provides equipment and technologies for the well completion process and production phase of a well's lifecycle. The segment produces intervention and stimulation equipment for pressure pumping, coiled tubing, and wireline operations; composite piping systems, pressure vessels, and structures; integrated processing, production, and pumping equipment (including artificial lift) for upstream, midstream, and industrial operations; hydrate inhibition and gas processing technologies; subsea and floating production systems, including flexible pipe and subsea water injection technologies; integral and weld-on connectors for conductor strings, surface casing, and liners; and completion tools—including those involved in multistage hydraulic fracturing—liner hanger systems, and subsurface safety valves.

Awards and accolades
In 2008, NOV was listed as one of the world's most admired companies by Forbes. It was also listead as one of the 100 fastest growing companies by Fortune in both 2008 and 2009 and one of America's top companies by Forbes in 2009.

See also

 List of oilfield service companies

References

External links

Energy companies of the United States
Companies based in Houston
Companies listed on the New York Stock Exchange
Energy companies established in 1862
Oilfield services companies
1862 establishments in the United States